Przewóz  is a village in Żary County, Lubusz Voivodeship, in western Poland. It is located in the historic Lower Silesia region on the eastern shore of the Lusatian Neisse river, which today marks the border with Germany. Przewóz is the seat of the gmina (administrative district) called Gmina Przewóz.  The village has a population of about 850.

It is the site of a border crossing on the road between Żary and the German town of Görlitz. About  to the south is the Upper Lusatian village of Klein Priebus (Little Przewóz).

The former fortress, erected by the Silesian Piasts at the border with the lands of Upper Lusatia in the south, became part of the Duchy of Żagań in 1274. Duke Jan II the Mad had his older brother Balthasar imprisoned and starved to death at the castle's tower in 1472, shortly before he sold his duchy to Duke Albert III of Saxony. With Żagań, Przewóz fell back to the Kingdom of Bohemia in 1549, until in 1742 the bulk of Silesia was conquered and annexed by Prussia upon the First Silesian War. From 1871 on the area was part of the German Reich and by the implementation of the Oder-Neisse line in 1945 it fell to the Republic of Poland (see Territorial changes of Poland after World War II).

External links 

 Jewish Community in Przewóz on Virtual Shtetl

References

Villages in Żary County